Morgan Gardner Bulkeley High School (known as Bulkeley High School) is a public secondary school on the south side of Hartford, Connecticut. It was founded in 1926 and is part of the Hartford Public Schools district. The school has an academic focus on teacher preparation and humanities, as well as a computer science track. The school also has language classes in Arabic and Spanish.

Student body 
Bulkeley serves students in grades 9-12, with 616 students enrolled in the 2021-22 school year. Due to ongoing building renovations, students currently attend school at other locations (as of the 2021-22 school year).

Many Bulkeley students speak languages other than English, with about 36% classified as English Language Learners (compared to 9% statewide). About three quarters of students identify as Hispanic, one in five identify as Black or African American, and other groups are represented in smaller numbers. Students at the school experience a high rate of poverty, as measured by the proportion who qualify for the National School Lunch Program (88%, as compared to 41% of children enrolled in public schools statewide).

In the graduating class of 2022, seniors were accepted to colleges in Connecticut such as Capital Community College; Manchester Community College; the University of Connecticut; Eastern, Central, Southern and Western Connecticut State University; Quinnipiac University; as well as colleges in Massachusetts, Rhode Island, New Hampshire, New York, New Jersey, Pennsylvania and further afield.

History 
After World War I, Hartford's population grew rapidly, from just under 100,000 in 1910 to 163,000 in 1930. By the mid-1920s, Hartford Public High School could no longer serve all the city's secondary school students. The Hartford city government decided to build two new schools: Weaver High School for the north end, and Bulkeley High School for the south end.  Bulkeley's original building was designed by the same architects as Weaver High School, Frank Irving Cooper and Edward T. Wiley.

Bulkeley opened in 1926 and was named after businessman and politician Morgan Gardner Bulkeley, who was  Mayor of Hartford, a US Senator for the State of Connecticut, the 54th Governor, and for over forty years the president of the Aetna Life Insurance Company. When the school opened it had 949 students and 61 teachers; its first graduating class in 1927 had 115 students. Students attended school in the original building until 1974, when the high school moved two blocks to its current site at 300 Wethersfield Avenue. The 1926 structure is now home to the Michael D. Fox Elementary School.

At the end of the 1930s Bulkeley was one of three public high schools in Hartford, along with Hartford Public High School and Thomas Snell Weaver High School. Its enrollment of 1,743 represented about 28% of all high school students in Hartford (excluding junior high school).

Principal Gayle Allen-Greene served as head of the school for 20 years, retiring in 2017. The current principal is Brooke Lafreniere, replacing Digna Marte.

Renovation and finance investigation 
In 2018 the school building was slated for major renovations, estimated at $150 million, including plans to centralize the Hartford school district's food service at Bulkeley. During renovations, 9th and 10th graders attend school at 585 Wethersfield Avenue in Hartford (South Campus), while 11th and 12th graders attend school at 395 Lyme Street (North Campus). Renovations at Bulkeley High School are ongoing.

As of June 2022, federal prosecutors are investigating corruption and mismanagement of the renovation finances. The case originally focused on decisions by Konstantinos Diamantis, formerly director of school construction financing. Connecticut Governor Ned Lamont fired Diamantis in October of 2021 when suspicions arose about corrupt spending. During the investigations the case expanded and federal prosecutors are now investigating financial mismanagement of over $1 billion in state funds.

References

High schools in Connecticut
1926 establishments in Connecticut
Educational institutions established in 1926
Education in Hartford, Connecticut